The Vedavathi is a river in India. It rises from the Bababudanagiri Mountains of Western Ghats and flows through the states of Karnataka and Andhra Pradesh. The Vedavathi is also called the Hagari in Bellary District of Karnataka and parts of Andhra Pradesh. Two rivers, the Veda and Avathi, arise in the eastern part of the Sahyadri Hill range in Bababudangiri mountain ranges, flow east, and join near Pura to form the Vedavathi River. From there the river flows through Kadur Taluk Of Chikkamagalur District. Then it enters Hosadurga Taluk, Hiriyur Taluk and Challakere Taluk of Chitradurga district, respectively.

On the banks of the Vedavathi, there is a famous temple devoted to Shri Anjaneya at Kellodu, Hosadurga Taluk.

The Vani Vilasa Saagara reservoir constructed across river Vedavathi in Hiriyur taluk dates back a century. Vanivilas sagar is also known as Marikanive and this was first dam built by Sir M Vishweswariah and known first natural reservoir built between two hills. There is also a famous temple dedicated to Goddessess Devi called "Kanive Mariyamma". This temple is situated beside Dam Wall. Marikanive is a famous tourist attraction in Chitradurga District. There is a garden near the reservoir, which draws crowds on weekends.

A tributary called the Suvarnamukhi converges with Vedavathi at Koodalahalli, Hiriyur Taluk. It is considered to be a 'Punya Bhumi' or 'Sacred Land' by the locals. The Vedavathi river then flows from Hiriyur towards Narayanapura, Parashurampaura, Vrindavanahalli, where river flows circularly, hence village called Vrindavana Halli and then to Jajur (moodala jajur) Nagagondanahalli, Janamaddi and then enters Andhra Pradesh i.e. Bhairavani Thippa Dam (BT Project).
On the banks of Nagagondanahalli there is a famous mathematician named Chilumeswamy who was an avadhoot and there is a popular annual fair. On the other side of Vedvathi river there is a village Jajur. Main temples located in Jajur Kariyamma, Anjaneya, Shiva, Shri Kodanada Rama, Lakshmana, Sita, Anjenya, and Nagarakatte  and shri Shankaracharya.

The river then flows down to the southeastern state of Andhra Pradesh in Anantapur District, where the river is called the 'Hagari'. The river has a cultural significance, with the people along the belt of the Hagari depending entirely on the river for most of their needs. Bhairivani Tippa Reservoir is built across this river.

From there the river goes through Gundalaplli, Vepurala, Kanekallu and some drylands in Anantapur District. From Andhra Pradesh State, the river enters Bellary district. Then it flows through Bellary and Siruguppa Taluks. In Bellary Taluk, the river flows through Hagari and Moka Villages. Hence its name, Hagari River, as it flows through Hagari Village.

The Vedavathi River is a tributary to the Tungabhadra River, and finally joins the Tungabhadra River at Siddaragonde village in Siruguppa Taluk of Bellary District along its right bank. The total length of the Vedavathi River is 391 km from its origin to its confluence with the Tungabhadra River. It is a seasonal river and flows only in the rainy season and is dry for much of the year.

The state government has decided to rejuvenate the Vedavathi river in Chikmagalur district, which dries up during summer. In the last 20 years, the river has flowed in full splendour only during the rainy season. It remains dry in summer due to over exploitation of water resources and unplanned development. The plan includes construction of over 810 water-harvesting structures like percolation wells, injection wells and ponds.

Reservoirs 
 Vani Vilasa Sagara in Chitradurga district. Oldest dam of Karnataka built in 1897. It has reached its maximum storage capacity of 30 Tmcft only twice - 1933 and 2000.
 Bhairivani Tippa Reservoir in Anantapur District, Rayadurg Taluk, Gummagatta Mandal of Andhra Pradesh.

References 

Rivers of Karnataka
Rivers of Andhra Pradesh
Rivers of India